Tomaso Malvenda (1566 – 7 May 1628) was a Spanish Dominican exegete and historical critic.

Life
Malvenda was born in Xàtiva, Valencia.  He entered the Dominicans in his youth; at the age of thirty-five he seems to have already taught philosophy and theology. His criticisms on the Annales Ecclesiastici of Baronius, embodied in a letter to the letter to the author (1600), showed ability, and Baronius used his influence to have Malvenda summoned to Rome. Here he was an adviser to the cardinal, while also employed in revising the Dominican Breviary, annotating Brasichelli's Index Expurgatorius, and writing some annals of the order (they were published against his wishes and without his revision). To this period also belong his "Antichristo libri XI" (Rome, 1604), and "De paradiso voluptatis" (Rome, 1605).

Returning to Spain in 1608, Malvenda undertook a new version of the Old Testament in Latin, with commentaries. This he had carried as far as Ezechiel, xvi, 16, when he died. It gives a rendering into Latin of every word in the original; but many of the Latin words employed are intelligible only through equivalents supplied in the margin. The work was published at Lyon in 1650 as "Commentaria in S. Scripturam, una cum nova de verbo in verbum ex hebraeo translatione" etc.

References
Hugo von Hurter, Nomenclator

 Gerhard Podskalsky SJ. "Thomas Malvendas „De Antichristo“ (Lyon 1647) – zu einem Eckpfeiler der byzantinischen Reichseschatologie," in Brandes, Wolfram / Schmieder, Felicitas (hg), Endzeiten. Eschatologie in den monotheistischen Weltreligionen (Berlin, de Gruyter, 2008) (Millennium-Studien / Millennium Studies / Studien zu Kultur und Geschichte des ersten Jahrtausends n. Chr. / Studies in the Culture and History of the First Millennium C.E., 16), 363–368.

Notes

External links

Attribution

1566 births
1628 deaths
Spanish Dominicans
17th-century Spanish Roman Catholic theologians
Christian Hebraists
16th-century Spanish Roman Catholic theologians
Translators of the Bible into Latin